Membership software (also known as an association management system) is a computer software which provides associations, clubs and other membership organizations with the functionality they require to provide their services to their members.

It normally includes at least the following:
 Storing and editing member information in a database.
 Creating, renewing, upgrading and downgrading memberships.
 Communicating with members by email, social media, telephone or post.

Membership organizations have diverse needs and structures, and this is reflected in the additional features membership software sometimes includes:
 Organizing and selling tickets to events or series' of events.
 Publishing and delivering textual or audio-visual content.
 Providing advertising opportunities via listings or targeted placements.
 Facilitating interaction and collaborative file sharing between members.
 Tracking members' interests and activity to provide relevant services.
 Raising supplementary income from donations.

Like many other modern software, membership software was initially delivered as desktop software, evolved into website-based software delivered from a web server, and is now increasingly delivered as a software as a service.

In the initial (desktop software) and intermediate (website based software) stages of its development, Membership software was often combined with a separate public-facing website, which members would use to interact with the association (subscribing, booking events, purchasing content and advertising, posting discussions, uploading files). This necessitated complex integrations between proprietary membership software databases and content management systems. Today, membership software often integrates the core features of a content management system, to provide a single coherent interface for members and administrators. These are available as standalone or as plugins to popular open source content management systems.

The smallest associations and clubs often create their own ecosystem of services to offer some of the same functionality as membership software. They do this by using generic database or spreadsheet software, and adding on external options as they need them (e.g. event registration, online payments, or email newsletters).

The membership software market spans the rest of the industry, from small and medium-sized organizations with limited resources, to very large and complex multi-chapter organizations of national and international renown, to association management organizations which manage multiple associations using a single product. There are many products available from a wide variety of different commercial providers and open source projects. Most are generic, but many are also targeted at very particular segments (e.g., church software).

Multi-chapter membership software tailors to organizations that are made up of chapters, clubs, regions, or segments that are part of the larger association. This particular type of membership software allows the apex or parent level of the organization to have more control over how each of their chapters are managed. Included in this might be a shared database, templated websites, shared event calendar and more.

Membership software covers a massive range of uses, but in many instances it requires different membership levels, or access control levels. Depending on the software, it can even allow you to specify time limited access which is useful for time sensitive content. The access levels can be structured in a pyramidal form, where each access levels has access to the previous levels, or it can be vertical, where each access level has a standalone section they can access.

References

Administrative software
Marketing software